Pseudauchenipterus is a genus of driftwood catfish that occur in tropical South America.

Species
There are currently four described species in this genus:
 Pseudauchenipterus affinis (Steindachner, 1877)
 Pseudauchenipterus flavescens (C. H. Eigenmann & R. S. Eigenmann, 1888)
 Pseudauchenipterus jequitinhonhae (Steindachner, 1877)
 Pseudauchenipterus nodosus (Bloch, 1794) (Cocosoda catfish)

References
 

Auchenipteridae
Catfish genera
Taxa named by Pieter Bleeker